Formicoxenus chamberlini is a species of ant in the subfamily Myrmicinae. It is endemic to the United States.

References

External links

Myrmicinae
Hymenoptera of North America
Insects of the United States
Insects described in 1904
Endemic fauna of the United States
Taxonomy articles created by Polbot